Il est interdit d'interdire ! (meaning "it is forbidden to forbid") is a French aphorism first used on an RTL broadcast by Jean Yanne in the form of a mocking joke. This sentence later became one of the slogans of May 1968.

References

French words and phrases
French political catchphrases
1968 neologisms
May 1968 events in France
Aphorisms
Censorship